Stories (released on July 23, 2008) is J-pop artist Mayumi Iizuka's 12th album.

Exposition 
 This is a concept album centering on the theme of  "Stories," literally. This album, with an instrumental music and ten songs, expresses serial stories in turn, that is to say; prologue, meeting, unrequited love, both love, daily, lost, dream, meeting again, growing, happy end and story.
 This album also has an additional DVD with promoting movies of three songs, "Sincerely" (#2),  "Wasurenai." (#6), and "Kitto Zutto" (#8).

Track listing 
 Stories 〜prologue〜
 Composition: Shinichi Asada
 Arrangement: Michiaki Kato
 Sincerely
 Lyrics: Mayumi Iizuka and Sora Izumikawa
 Composition: Shinichi Asada
 Arrangement: Michiaki Kato
 Ashita Hareta nara (明日晴れたなら / If it is Fine Tomorrow)
 Lyrics: Mayumi Iizuka and Sora Izumikawa
 Composition: Sora Izumikawa
 Arrangement: Michiaki Kato
 Hajimete no Ichi-page (初めての1ページ / The First Page)
 Lyrics: Mayumi Iizuka and Sora Izumikawa
 Composition: Sora Izumikawa
 Arrangement: Michiaki Kato
 Always... Forever...
 Lyrics: Mayumi Iizuka and Sora Izumikawa
 Composition: Sora Izumikawa
 Arrangement: Sora Izumikawa and marhy
 Wasurenai. (忘れない。 / I Shall Never Forget.)
 Lyrics: Mayumi Iizuka and Sora Izumikawa
 Composition: Kohei Dojima
 Arrangement: Tomofumi Suzuki
 Starry Night
 Lyrics: Mayumi Iizuka and Sora Izumikawa
 Composition: Sora Izumikawa
 Arrangement: Michiaki Kato
 Kitto Zutto (きっと ずっと / Assuredly Forever)
 Lyrics: Mayumi Iizuka and Sora Izumikawa
 Composition: cota
 Arrangement: Michiaki Kato
 Love Knot
 Lyrics: Mayumi Iizuka and Sora Izumikawa
 Composition: Sora Izumikawa
 Arrangement: Tomofumi Suzuki
 Polaris
 Lyrics: Mayumi Iizuka and Sora Izumikawa
 Composition: Sora Izumikawa
 Arrangement: Michiaki Kato
 Kimi eto Tsuzuku Story (君へと続くストーリー / Story that Leads to You)
 Lyrics: Mayumi Iizuka and Sora Izumikawa
 Composition: Tomoki Hasegawa
 Arrangement: Tomoki Hasegawa

External links 
12th Album of Mayumi Iizuka "Stories" released on July 23! From August 3, Live Tour "Strawberry Summer Stories 2008" is beginning!!  -  August 2008

2008 albums
Mayumi Iizuka albums